Gaul  was an important early center of Latin Christianity in late antiquity and the Merovingian period.
By the middle of the 3rd century, there were several churches organized in Roman Gaul, and soon after the cessation of persecution the bishops of the Latin world assembled at Arles, in AD 314.   
The Church of Gaul passed through three dogmatic crises in the late Roman period, Arianism, Priscillianism and Pelagianism.
Under Merovingian rule, a number of "Frankish synods" were held, marking a particularly Germanic development in the Western Church.
A model for the following Frankish synods was set by Clovis I, who organized the First Council of Orléans (511).

Establishment of Christianity in Gaul

The first mention of Christianity in the context of Roman Gaul dates to AD 177 and the   persecution in Lyon, the religious center of Roman Gaul where the Sanctuary of the Three Gauls was located.

The forty-eight martyrs at Lyon (ancient Lugdunum, "citadel of Lugus," the so-called Gallic Mercury) represented every rank of Gallo-Roman society. Among them were Vettius Epagathus, an aristocrat; the physician Attalus of Pergamus, of the professional class; from the Church, Saint Pothinus Bishop of Lyon, with the neophyte Maturus and the deacon Sanctus; and the young slaves Blandina. and Ponticus.

The sole account of the persecution is a letter preserved by Eusebius, from the Christians of Lyon and Vienne, the latter still known then as Vienna Allobrogum and the capital of the continental Celtic Allobroges. The letter is considered one the gems of Christian literature. It implies that the Church of Lyons was the only organized church in Gaul at the time. That of Vienne appears to have been dependent on it and, to judge from similar cases, was probably administered by a deacon.

How or where Christianity first gained a foothold in Gaul is purely a matter of conjecture. The firm establishment of Christianity in Gaul was undoubtedly due to missionaries from Asia. Saint Pothinus was a disciple of St. Polycarp, Bishop of Smyrna, as was also his successor, Irenaeus. Most likely the first missionaries came by sea, touched at Marseilles, and progressed up the river Rhône till they established the religion at Lyon, the metropolis and centre of communication for the whole country. The Christians of the community in Lyon and Vienne were "predominantly of eastern background" and maintained closed ties with the community in Rome. 

Eusebius speaks of letters written by the Churches of Gaul of which Irenaeus is bishop. These letters were written on the occasion of the second event which brought the Church of Gaul into prominence. Easter was not celebrated on the same day in all Christian communities; towards the end of the 2nd century Pope Victor wished to universalize the Roman usage and excommunicated the Churches of Asia Minor which were Quartodeciman. Irenaeus intervened to restore peace. About the same time, in an inscription found at Autun (ancient Augustodunum, the capital of the Celtic Aedui), a certain Pectorius celebrated in Greek verse the Ichthys or fish, symbol of the Eucharist. A third event in which the bishops of Gaul appear is the Novatian controversy. Bishop Faustinus of Lyon and other colleagues in Gaul are mentioned in 254 by St. Cyprian as opposed to Novatian, whereas Marcianus of Arles was favourable to him.

Local legends
A series of local legends trace back the foundation of the principal sees to the Apostles. Early in the 6th century, Caesarius of Arles disregards anachronism in making the first Bishop of Vaison, Daphnus, a disciple of the Apostles, even though his signature appears at the Council of Arles in 314. One hundred years earlier one of his predecessors, Patrocles, based various claims of his Church on the fact that St. Trophimus, founder of the Church of Arles, was a disciple of the Apostles.

Such claims were flattering to local vanity; during the Middle Ages and over the centuries many legends grew up in support of them. The evangelization of Gaul has often been attributed to missionaries sent from Rome by St. Clement. This theory inspired a whole series of fallacious narratives and forgeries that complicate and obscure the historical record.

Gregory of Tours
More faith can be placed in a statement of Gregory of Tours in his Historia Francorum (I, xxviii), on which was based the second group of narratives concerning the evangelisation of Gaul. According to him, in the year 250 Rome sent seven bishops, who founded as many churches in Gaul: Gatianus the Church of Tours, Trophimus that of Arles, Paul that of Narbonne, Saturninus that of Toulouse, Denis that of Paris, Stremonius (Austremonius) that of Auvergne (Clermont), and Martialis that of Limoges. Gregory's statement has been accepted with some reservations by historians. Nevertheless, even though Gregory, a late successor of Gatianus, may have had access to information on the beginnings of his church, but an interval of three hundred years separates him from the events he chronicles; moreover, this statement of his involves some serious chronological difficulties, of which he was himself aware, e. g. in the case of the bishops of Paris. The most we can say for him is that he echoes a contemporary tradition, which represents the general point of view of the 6th century rather than the facts. It is impossible to say how much legend is mingled with the reality.

Extent of Christian belief

By the middle of the 3rd century, as St. Cyprian bears witness, there were several churches organized in Gaul. They suffered little from the great persecution. Constantius Chlorus, the father of Constantine, was not hostile to Christianity, and soon after the cessation of persecution the bishops of the Latin world assembled at Arles (314). Their signatures, which are still extant, prove that the following sees were then in existence:

diocese of Vienne,
diocese of Marseilles,
diocese of Arles,
diocese of Orange,
diocese of Vaison,
diocese of Apt,
diocese of Nice,
diocese of Lyon,
diocese of Autun,
diocese of Cologne,
diocese of Trier,
diocese of Reims,
diocese of Rouen,
diocese of Bordeaux,
diocese of Gabali, and
diocese of Eauze.

Also:
 
diocese of Toulouse,
diocese of Narbonne,
diocese of Clermont,
diocese of Bourges, and
diocese of Paris.

This date marks the beginning of a new era in the history of the Church of Gaul. The towns had been early won over to the new Faith; the work of evangelization was now extended and continued during the 4th and 5th centuries. The cultured classes, however, long remained faithful to the old traditions. Teacher and humanist Ausonius was a Christian, but gives so little evidence of it that the fact has been questioned. His pupil Paulinus entered the religious life, at which, however, the world of letters was deeply scandalized; so much so, indeed, that Paulinus had to write to Ausonius to justify himself. At the same period there were pagan rhetoricians who celebrated in the schools, as at Autun, the virtues and deeds of the Christian emperors. By the close of the 5th century, however, the majority of scholars in Gaul were Christians. Generation by generation the change came about. Salvianus, the fiery apologist (died c. 492), was the son of pagan parents. Hilary of Poitiers, Sulpicius Severus (the Christian Sallust), Paulinus of Nola, and Sidonius Apollinaris strove to reconcile the Church and the world of letters. Sidonius himself is not altogether free from suggestions of paganism handed down by tradition. In Gaul as elsewhere the question arose as to whether the Gospel could really adapt itself to literary culture. With the inroads of the barbarians the discussion came to an end.

It is nonetheless true that throughout the Empire the progress of Christianity had been made chiefly in the cities. The country-places were yet strongholds of what the Christians viewed as idolatry, which in Gaul was upheld by a twofold tradition. The old Gallic religion, and Graeco-Roman paganism, still had ardent supporters. Among the Gallo-Roman population the use of spells and charms for the cure of sickness, or on the occasion of a death, was still commonplace; the people worshiped spirits in springs and trees, believed in other nature spirits such as the Graeco-Roman nymphs, observed days of solar and lunar significance as sacred, and practiced divination. Some of these customs were survivals of very ancient traditions; they had come down through the Celtic and the Roman period, and had no doubt at times received the imprint of the Gallic and Graeco-Roman beliefs. The Gallic folk beliefs and practices dated back into the obscurity of pre-Roman times. These forms of spirituality were the principal obstacle encountered by the missionaries in the rural places. Saint Martin, a native of Pannonia, Bishop of Tours, and founder of monasteries, undertook especially in Central Gaul a crusade against this rural idolatry. On one occasion, when he was felling a sacred tree in the neighbourhood of Autun, a peasant attacked him, and he had an almost miraculous escape. Besides Saint Martin other popular preachers traversed the rural districts, e.g. Victricius, Bishop of Rouen, another converted soldier, also Martin's disciples, especially Saint Martin of Brives. But their scattered and intermittent efforts made no lasting effect on the minds of the peasants. About 395 a Gallic rhetorician depicts a scene in which peasants discuss the mortality among their flocks. One of them boasts the virtue of the sign of the cross, "the sign of that God Who alone is worshipped in the large cities" (Riese, Anthologia Latina, no. 893, v. 105). This expression, however, is too strong, for at that very period a single church sufficed for the Christian population of Trier. Nevertheless, the rural parts continued the more refractory. At the beginning of the 5th century, there took place in the neighbourhood of Autun the procession of Cybele's chariot to bless the harvest. In the 6th century, in the city of Arles, one of the regions where Christianity had gained its earliest and strongest foothold, Bishop Caesarius was still struggling against popular superstitions, and some of his sermons are yet among our important sources of information on folk-lore.

Gallic monasticism
The Christianization of the lower classes of the people was greatly aided by the newly established monasteries. In Gaul as elsewhere the first Christian ascetics lived in the world and kept their personal freedom. The practice of religious life in common was introduced by Saint Martin (died c. 397) and Cassian (died c. 435). Martin established near Tours the "grand monastère", i.e. Marmoutier, where in the beginning the monks lived in separate grottoes or wooden huts. A little later Cassian founded two monasteries at Marseilles (415). He had previously visited the monks of the East, and especially Egypt, and had brought back their methods, which he adapted to the circumstances of Gallo-Roman life. Through two of his works "De institutis coenobiorum" and the "Collationes XXIV", he became the doctor of Gallic asceticism. About the same time Honoratus founded a famous monastery on the little isle of Lérins (Lerinum) near Marseilles destined to become a centre of Christian life and ecclesiastical influence. Episcopal sees of Gaul were often objects of competition and greed, and were rapidly becoming the property of certain aristocratic families, all of whose representatives in the episcopate were not as wise and upright as Germanus of Auxerre or Sidonius Apollinaris. Lérins took up the work of reforming the episcopate, and placed many of its own sons at the head of dioceses: Honoratus, Hilary, and Caesarius at Arles; Eucherius at Lyons, and his sons Salonius and Veranius at Geneva and Vence respectively; Lupus at Troyes; Maximus and Faustus at Riez. Lérins too became a school of mysticism and theology and spread its religious ideas far and wide by useful works on dogma, polemics, and hagiography. Other monasteries were founded in Gaul, e.g. Grigny near Vienne, Ile Barbe at Lyons, Réomé (later known as Moutier-Saint-Jean), Morvan, Saint-Claude in the Jura, Chinon, Loches etc. It is possible, however, that some of these foundations belong to the succeeding period. The monks had not yet begun to live according to any fixed and codified rule. For such written constitutions we must await the time of Caesarius of Arles. Monasticism was not established without opposition. Rutilius Namatianus, a pagan, denounced the monks of Lérins as a brood of night-owls; even the effort to make chastity the central virtue of Christianity met with much resistance, and the adversaries of Priscillian in particular were imbued with this hostility to a certain degree. It was also one of the objections raised by Vigilantius of Calagurris, the Spanish priest whom St. Jerome denounced so vigorously. Vigilantius had spent much time in Gaul and seems to have died there. The law of ecclesiastical celibacy was less stringent, less generally enforced than in Italy, especially Rome. The series of Gallic councils before the Merovingian epoch bear witness at once to the undecided state of discipline at the time, and also to the continual striving after some fixed disciplinary code.

Theological strife

The Church of Gaul passed through three dogmatic crises. Its bishops seem to have been greatly preoccupied with Arianism; as a rule they clung to the teaching of the Council of Nicaea, in spite of a few temporary or partial defections. Athanasius, who had been exiled to Trier (336-38), exerted a powerful influence on the episcopate of Gaul; one of the great champions of orthodoxy in the West was Hilary of Poitiers, who also suffered exile for his constancy. 

Priscillianism had a greater hold on the masses of the faithful. It was above all a method, an ideal of Christian life, which appealed to all, even to women. It was condemned (380) at the Synod of Saragossa where the Bishops of Bordeaux and Agen were present; nonetheless it spread rapidly in Central Gaul, Eauze in particular being a stronghold. When in 385 the usurper Maximus put Priscillian and his friends to death, Saint Martin was in doubt how to act, but repudiated with horror communion with the bishops who had condemned the unfortunates. Priscillianism, indeed, was more or less bound up with the cause of asceticism in general. Finally the bishops and monks of Gaul were long divided over Pelagianism. Proculus, Bishop of Marseille, had obliged Leporius, a disciple of Pelagius, to leave Gaul, but it was not long before Marseille and Lérins, led by Cassian, Vincent and Faustus, became hotbeds of a teaching opposed to St. Augustine's and known as Semipelagianism. Prosper of Aquitaine wrote against it, and was obliged to take refuge at Rome. It was not until the beginning of the 6th century that the teaching of Augustine triumphed, when a monk of Lérins, Caesarius of Arles, a follower of Augustine, caused it to be adopted by the Council of Orange (529).

In the final struggle Rome intervened. We do not know much concerning the earlier relations between the bishops of Gaul and the pope. The position of Irenaeus in the Easter Controversy shows a considerable degree of independence; yet Irenaeus proclaimed the primacy of the See of Rome, which he based on the Apostolic Succession and, equally importantly, right teaching, orthodoxy (whereas the Gnostics whom he opposed were mere itinerant preachers without authority). About the middle of the 3rd century the pope was appealed to for the purpose of settling difficulties in the Church of Gaul and to remove an erring bishop (Cyprian, Epist. lxviii). At the Council of Arles (314) the bishops of Gaul were present with those of Brittany, Spain, Africa, even Italy; Pope Sylvester sent delegates to represent him. It was in a way a Council of the West. During all that century, however, the episcopate of Gaul had no head, and the bishops grouped themselves according to the ties of friendship or locality. Metropolitans did not exist as yet, and when advice was needed Milan was consulted. "The traditional authority", says Duchesne, "in all matters of discipline remained always the ancient Church of Rome; in practice, however, the Council of Milan decided in case of conflict." The popes then took the situation in hand, and in 417 Pope Zosimus made Patrocles, Bishop of Arles, his vicar or delegate in Gaul, and provided that all disputes should be referred to him. Moreover, no Gallic ecclesiastic could have access to the pope without testimonial letters from the Bishop of Aries. This primacy of Aries waxed and waned under the succeeding popes. It enjoyed a final period of brilliancy, under Caesarius, but after his time it conferred on the occupant merely an honorary title. In consequence, however, of the extensive authority of Arles in the 5th and 6th centuries, canonical discipline was more rapidly developed there, and the "Libri canonum" that were soon in vogue in Southern Gaul were modelled on those of the Church of Aries. Towards the end of this period Caesarius assisted at a series of councils, thus obtaining a certain recognition as legislator for the Merovingian Church.

The invasions

The barbarians, however, were on the march. The great invasion of 407 across the Rhine disrupted Gaul for almost 3 years until they passed over into Spain in September or October 409. Gaul was free of invaders but subjected to civil wars between imperial contenders until 413, when the imperial government of Emperor Honorius restored order. The Visigoths left Italy in 411 and settled in southwest Gaul and northeast Spain until finally being settled in a swatch of territory from Toulouse to the Atlantic coast north of Bordeaux in 416. The Visigoths were Arians and hostile to Catholicism.

Gradually the necessities of life imposed a policy of moderation. The Council of Agde, really a national council of Visigothic Gaul (506), and in which Caesarius was dominant, is an evidence of the new temper on both sides. The Acts of this council follow very closely the principles laid down in the Breviarium Alarici—a summary of the Theodocian Code drawn up by Alaric II, the Visigothic king, for his Gallo-Roman subjects—and met with the approval of the Catholic bishops of his kingdom.

Between 410 and 413 the Burgundians had settled near Mains and were settled in Savoy in 443. In 475 they moved  farther south along the Rhône, and about this time became Arian Christians. The Franks, soon to be masters of all Gaul, left the neighbourhood of Tournai, defeated Syagrius, the last representative of Roman authority in central north Gaul, in 486, and extended their power to the Loire. In 507 they defeated the Visigoth Kingdom in the Battle of Vouillé, confining their domain to Spain, except for a strip of territory along the Mediterranean coast. In 534 the Burgundians were defeated; in 536 by the conquest of Arles they succeeded to the remnants of the great state created by King Theodoric the Great.

The transition from one regime to another was eased by the bishops of Gaul. The bishops had frequently played a role as intermediaries with the Roman authorities. It was long believed that they had been invested with special powers and the official title of defensores civitatum (defenders of the states). While this title was never officially borne by them, the popular error was only formal and superficial. 
Bishops like Sidonius Apollinaris, Avitus, Germanus of Auxerre, Caesarius of Arles, upheld the social fabric. The bishops were guardians of the classical traditions of Latin literature and Roman culture, and long before the appearance of monasticism had been the mainstay of learning.

Christianity in Merovingian Gaul

Throughout the 6th and 7th centuries manuscripts of the Bible and the Church were copied to meet the needs of public worship, ecclesiastical teaching, and Catholic life. The only contemporary buildings that exhibit traces of classical or Byzantine styles are religious edifices.

Regional synods had been held regularly in the Church of Gaul, more than thirty of them between 314 and 506. 
Under Merovingian rule, a number of "Frankish synods" were held, marking a particularly Germanic development in the Western Church: to the usual regional or provincial councils, Germanic peoples added a traditional element from their systems of government, the idea of a national council, which was influenced by the Christian East. 
They also indicate a growing congruence between church and state. While Arian rulers kept their distance from the general councils, Visigoth rulers began influencing the councils only after the conversion of Reccared I. As soon as they had established themselves, Merovingian kings (and the Carolingians after them) exerted their influence on the councils. According to Gregory Halfond, such congruence was a particular quality of the Gallo-Roman church, in which the Roman aristocracy made up an important part of the leadership of the Gallo-Roman (and later the Frankish) church; continuity in this power nexus is indicated also by the continued use of Roman procedures in the councils.

An early important churchman is Caesarius of Arles, who   organized   regional synods, which were mostly concerned with conforming the canons and practices of the Church of Gaul to those of other Churches. At Orange, for instance, he had earlier (Pelagian) practices of the Gallic church anathematized, and at the ensuing council in Vaison liturgical conformity with other Churches (Italy, Africa, the East) was established. 
A model for the following Frankish synods was set by Clovis I, who organized the First Council of Orléans (511); though he did not himself attend it, he set the agenda and followed the proceedings closely (at stake was "the unification of the Roman church under Frankish rule"). After the waning of Caesarius's influence and the establishment of Merovingian rule, the focus of the soon-to-be Frankish Church shifted north, to deal with the growing problem of adjusting to "deeply embedded Germanic practices"; rather than Pelagianism or Predestinatarianism, bishops now had to deal with problems involving "marriage, the relations between a warrior aristocracy and clergy, or monks and nuns, the conflicts born of royal influence and control, or of property rights".
By the eighth century,  the regular organization of synods had largely disappeared, and when Boniface complained to Pope Zacharias in 742 that there hadn't been a synod in the Frankish church in at least eighty years, he was not exaggerating by much.

See also
Diocese of Gaul
Praetorian prefecture of Gaul

References

Sources

Attribution
 The entry states:
"After the writings of EUSEBIUS OF CAESARIA, SULPICIUS SEVERUS, PAULINUS OF NOLA, SALVIANUS, GREGORY OF TOURS, etc., our principal source of information is the epigraphic material published by LE BLANT, Inscriptions chrétiennes de la Gaule antérieures au VIIIe siècle (Paris, 1858–85), with a supplement (1897);
, Les sarcophages chrétiens de la Gaule (Paris, 1896). SIRMOND AND LALANDE, Concilia Antigua Galliae (4 vols., fol., 1629–66);
"also the catalogues or lists of bishops preserved in many dioceses and edited by DELISLE in Histoire littéraire de la France, XXIX."
"General works devoted to the history and study of Christianity have chapters on the Church in Gaul. Special reference works:"
DUCHESNE, Fastes épiscopaux de l'ancienne Gaule, I (1894; 2nd ed., 1907), II (1900);
HOUTIN, La controverse de l'apostolicité des églises de France au XIXe siècle (Paris, 1901);
Analecta Bollandiana, XIX, 354;
MORIN, Saint Lazare et saint Maximin in Mémoires de la société des antiquaires de France, LIX (Paris, 1898);
AUBÉ in Revue historique, VII (1878) 152-64;
DUCHESNE, Origines du culte chrétien (Paris, 1889), 32, 84;
, La première collection romaine des décrétales in Atti del secondo congresso d'archeologia cristiana (Rome, 1902), 159;

History of Christianity in France
Gallo-Roman religion